Nia Daniati (born 17 April 1964) is an Indonesian singer and actress. Daniati gained fame with her hit single "Gelas-Gelas Kaca" and also through singing several songs written by musician Rinto Harahap. In addition, Daniati has appeared in several soap operas and films, including Antara Dia dan Aku which led to her being nominated for the Best Actress at the Indonesian Film Festival.

Daniati released many studio albums and singles in the 1980s and 1990s during her career in the local music industry.

Personal life
On 25 September 1991, Daniati married Mohammad Hisham, a businessman from Brunei in Jakarta and the couple later had a daughter. After a year of marriage, Daniati and Hisham divorced. In 2002, Daniati married lawyer Farhat Abbas, who is 12 years her junior. In 2014, Daniati filed for divorce from Abbas, due to him having an affair with his spokeswoman .

In November 2021, her daughter Olivia Nathania was arrested for a civil servant candidate (CPNS) recruitment fraud.

Discography

Studio albums
 Country vol.1
 Nia Daniati The Best Of Pop Bossas
 Nia Daniati Mega Pop Intim Vol 3
 Nia Daniati 15 Lagu Terbaik
 Tembang Asmara Vol. 1 (Siapa Tak Ingin Disayang)
 Tembang Asmara Vol. 3 (Masih Ada Cinta)
 Tembang Asmara Vol. 4 (Tak Ingin Seperti Dia)
 Tembang Asmara Vol. 6 (Aku Tak Ingin Dimadu)
 Tak Ingin Seperti Dia I (1993)
 Tak Ingin Seperti Dia II (1998)
 Tak Ingin Seperti Dia III (2016)

Filmography

References

1964 births
Living people
People from Jakarta
Sundanese people
Indonesian Muslims
Indonesian people of Malay descent
20th-century Indonesian women singers
Indonesian actresses
Universal Music Group artists